Oegoconiinae is a subfamily of moths in the family Autostichidae.

Taxonomy and systematics
 Apatema Walsingham, 1900
 Apateona Gozmány, 2008	
 Dysallomima Gozmány, 2008
 Oegoconia Stainton, 1854

Former genera
 Nemotyla Nielsen, McQuillan & Common, 1992 (placed in Oecophorinae)

References

Oegoconiinae at funet

 
Moth subfamilies